Schaeffler Technologies AG & Co. KG, also known as Schaeffler Group (Schaeffler-Gruppe in German), is a German manufacturer of rolling element bearings for automotive, aerospace and industrial uses. It was founded in 1946 by brothers Dr. Wilhelm and Dr.-Ing. E. h. Georg Schaeffler.

The firm is currently majority owned by Maria-Elizabeth Schaeffler-Thumann and her son Georg F. W. Schaeffler through a series of holding companies. These holding companies, controlled by the Schaeffler family, also own controlling interests in Continental AG and Vitesco Technologies.

Schaeffler Group owns the brands INA, FAG, and LuK. In Germany, these main brands are marketed by Schaeffler Technologies AG & Co. KG and LuK GmbH & Co. oHG.

Schaeffler has an Indian subsidiary, Schaeffler India, which is publicly listed on the National Stock Exchange of India and the Bombay Stock Exchange.

History 
1883: Friedrich Fischer of Schweinfurt designs a machine to allow steel balls to be ground to an absolutely round state for the first time – and in large volumes.
1905: On 29 July, the FAG brand is registered with the patent office in Berlin. The registered trademark FAG is an acronym for "Fischer's Automatische Gussstahlkugelfabrik," or "Fischer's Automatic Steel Ball Factory."
1939: Acquisition of Davistan AG, a Jewish founded textiles company.
1946: Brothers Wilhelm and Georg Schaeffler, both holders of Ph.D. degrees, found INA in Herzogenaurach.
1949: The needle roller cage, developed by Georg Schaeffler, makes the needle roller bearing a reliable component for industrial applications.
1965: LuK Lamellen und Kupplungsbau GmbH is founded in Bühl (with INA as one of the investors).
1999: INA takes over LuK GmbH.
2002: Acquisition of FAG Kugelfischer AG, Schweinfurt.
2003: INA, FAG and LuK form the Schaeffler Group.
2008: Schaeffler Group buys the much larger Continental AG (Germany).
2009: President and CEO of the Schaeffler Group, Dr. Jürgen M. Geissinger, was elected president of the World Bearing Association.
2011: Schaeffler Group becomes Schaeffler AG and Schaeffler Technologies AG & Co. KG
2013: On 4 October, an employee letter said "... Mr. Klaus Rosenfeld will take over as acting CEO in addition to his current responsibilities as Chief Financial Officer".
2013: The third generation of Schaeffler's electric axle, presented in Schaeffler's ACTIVeDRIVE, becomes a pilot production product.
2014: Schaeffler opens its first Russian plant in Ulyanovsk, from which it supplies products to both domestic and overseas automobile manufacturers as well as to the railway industry.
2015: Schaeffler successfully completes its initial public offering on 9 October 2015, under the motto "We share our success".
2016: The strategy "Mobility for tomorrow" is adopted. U.S. and China plants are expanded and a new facility is opened in Chonburi, Thailand, along with a new office in Moscow, Russia.
2018: Schaeffler fitted four electric motors from the ABT Schaeffler FE01 Formula E car to an Audi A3 for testing only.

World War II 

During the 2008 merger, the company revealed that in World War II it had exploited thousands of slave labourers in its plants in German-occupied Poland. Around this time the director of the museum now standing at the site of the Auschwitz concentration camp claimed that after the war  of human hair had been found at Schaeffler factories, and had been used in upholstery in its automotive products. The historian at Schaeffler denied this particular allegation.

Schaeffler Family Ownership 
In August 2008, the Schaeffler family agreed to a staggered €12 billion acquisition of larger rival Continental AG, whereby the family would defer taking a majority stake until at least 2012. However, in 2011 the family sold off €1.8 billion worth of shares, reducing its stake from 75.1% to 60.3%. Currently, the family owns 46% of Continental shares. The family also owns 46% of Vitesco Technologies.

See also 
 Georg F. W. Schaeffler

References 

Industrial machine manufacturers
Manufacturing companies of Germany
Companies based in Herzogenaurach
Manufacturing companies　established in 1883
Bearing manufacturers
Companies involved in the Holocaust
Companies listed on the Frankfurt Stock Exchange
2015 initial public offerings
German brands
German companies established in 1883